The 2022 Copa Faulcombridge was a professional tennis tournament played on clay courts. It was the 1st edition of the tournament which was part of the 2022 ATP Challenger Tour. It took place in Valencia, Spain between 21 and 27 November 2022.

Singles main-draw entrants

Seeds

 1 Rankings are as of 14 November 2022.

Other entrants
The following players received wildcards into the singles main draw:
  Carlos López Montagud
  Daniel Mérida
  Nikolás Sánchez Izquierdo

The following players received entry into the singles main draw using protected rankings:
  Sumit Nagal
  Pedro Sousa

The following player received entry into the singles main draw as an alternate:
  Oleksii Krutykh

The following players received entry from the qualifying draw:
  Javier Barranco Cosano
  Salvatore Caruso
  Ivan Gakhov
  Pablo Llamas Ruiz
  Álvaro López San Martín
  Gian Marco Moroni

The following player received entry as a lucky loser:
  Alessandro Giannessi

Champions

Singles

 Oleksii Krutykh def.  Luca Van Assche 6–2, 6–0.

Doubles

 Oleksii Krutykh /  Oriol Roca Batalla def.  Ivan Sabanov /  Matej Sabanov 6–3, 7–6(7–3).

References

2022 ATP Challenger Tour
2022 in Spanish tennis
November 2022 sports events in Spain